The Mountain West Conference Football Championship Game is an annual postseason college football game played to determine the champion of the Mountain West Conference (MW).

History

From 1999 to 2012, the champion of the Mountain West was determined by regular season record. Beginning in 2013, following the expansion to twelve members and the division of the conference into Mountain and West Divisions, the conference championship game is held between the two division winners.  The Mountain West is one of four conferences to have its championship game at a campus site, along with the American Athletic Conference, Conference USA, and the Sun Belt Conference.

The upcoming 2022 championship game is the last to feature division winners. On May 20, 2022, the MW announced that it would eliminate its football divisions effective with the 2023 season, instead sending the top two teams in the conference standings to the title game. Two days earlier, the NCAA Division I Council had approved a rule change that gave all FBS conferences full freedom to determine the participants in their football championship games.

The inaugural MW Championship Game was played on December 7, 2013 at Fresno State's Bulldog Stadium and televised by CBS.

The Mountain West Conference champion customarily receives a berth to play in the Las Vegas Bowl. However, if the MW champion finishes ranked ahead of the champions from the other "Group of Five" mid-major conferences (American Athletic Conference, Conference USA, MAC, and Sun Belt) by the selection committee of the College Football Playoff, it is guaranteed a berth in one of the non-semifinal "New Year's Six" bowls. If ranked in the top four, the conference champion will play in the national championship playoff.

Divisions
Membership reflects changes that took effect with the 2013 season.

Past champions

Pre-championship game era (1999–2012)

Final AP Poll rankings shown.

Mountain West Conference Championship Game (2013–present)
Below are the results from all Mountain West Conference Football Championship Games played. The winning team appears in bold font, on a background of their primary team color. Rankings are from the AP Poll released prior to the game.

 Due to the COVID-19 pandemic, the 2020 game was played behind closed doors without fans.

Results by team

Colorado State, Nevada, New Mexico, and UNLV have yet to make an appearance in a Mountain West Championship Game.

Selection criteria
The division champion is the team with the highest conference winning percentage.

Two-team tiebreaker procedure
Head-to-head record between the tied teams
Winning percentage of the tied teams within the division
Winning percentage against the next-highest placed team in the division, with placing based on the team's conference record, and proceeding through the division
Winning percentage of the tied teams against common conference opponents
Higher College Football Playoff ranking (or composite of selected computer ranking if neither team is ranked) following the final week of the regular season
Overall winning percentage against FBS opponents
Coin toss

NOTE:  If inclement weather forces the head-to-head game between the two tied teams to be cancelled or end in a tie, the tiebreaker procedure ensures the tie will be broken by other means if necessary.

Three or more-team tiebreaker procedure
Head-to-head record among the tied teams
Winning percentage among the tied teams within the division
Winning percentage among the tied teams against the next-highest placed team in the division, with placing based on the team's conference record, and proceeding through the division
Winning percentage among the tied teams against common conference opponents
Higher College Football Playoff ranking (or composite of selected computer ranking if neither team is ranked) following the final week of the regular season

Once the tie is reduced to two teams, then the two-team tiebreaker is used.

Host determination

Current procedure
The division champion with the better conference record will host the championship game. If the teams have the same record, the following tie-breaking procedure is used:
Head-to-head record
Higher College Football Playoff ranking going into the final week of regular season, excluding teams who are not ranked and/or that lost their final regular season game
Composite of selected computer rankings
Record versus common conference opponents
Highest overall winning percentage (conference and non-conference excluding exempt games)
Coin toss

2013–2017 procedure
From 2013 to 2017, the division champion with the higher College Football Playoff ranking going into the final week of regular season was designated as the host school unless it lost its final regular season game.  If the latter occurred, or neither team was ranked in the latest available College Football Playoff rankings, then the following procedure was used:
Team with better composite ranking among selected computer rankings
Head-to-head record
Record versus common conference opponents
Winning percentage against the next-highest placed common conference opponent and proceeding through the conference, with placing based on:
Placement within the division
Overall conference record
Composite of selected computer rankings
Coin toss

This procedure was discontinued after the 2017 Mountain West Conference Football Championship Game after Boise State was selected to host the game despite having the same conference record as their opponent Fresno State and losing to Fresno State during the regular season.

Game records

Source:

See also
 List of NCAA Division I FBS conference championship games

References

 
Recurring sporting events established in 2013
2013 establishments in California